Victor Skersis (Russian: Виктор Анта́насович Скерсис, born July 5, 1956, Moscow) — Moscow conceptualist. Artist, theoretician.

Life and work 
Studied at the Moscow State Polygraphic Institute (1973-1977). The institute forced him to withdraw two weeks before he was to graduate. Areas of interest include analytical conceptualism, metaconceptualism. An active member of the Moscow art scene since 1975, Skersis works independently and in co-authorship with other artists. He was a member of "The Nest" (with Gennady Donskoi and Mikhail Roshal'), 1975–79, "SZ" (with Vadim Zakharov), 1980–84, 1989–90, "Cupid" (with Yuri Albert and Andrei Filippov), "Edelweiss" and “Tsar of the Hill” (Yuri Albert, Paruir Davtyan, and Andrei Filippov), and others.

A participant of numerous unofficial art shows in the Soviet Union in the 1970s and 1980s, including the 1975 nonconformist art show in the Culture Pavilion at VDNKh, Moscow; the 1977 Venice Biennale "La nuova arte Sovietica"; exhibits at APTART gallery, Moscow 1982-84; “The Other Art. Moscow 1956-1976,” The Tret'yakov State Gallery, Moscow and The State Russian Museum, Leningrad 1990-1991; “40 years of nonconformist art,” The Central Exhibition Hall Manezh Moscow 2002; “Sots-Art. Political art in Russia,” Maison Rouge, Paris, France, The Tret'yakov State Gallery, Moscow, 2007-2008; “Kollektsiia,” Pompidou Centre, 2016; “Thinking Pictures: Moscow Conceptual Art,” Zimmerli Art Museum, New Brunswick, 2016.

Victor Skersis lives and works in Moscow and the US, where he is engaged in fundamental research into the processes of art.

From 1975 to 1979 he was a member of The Nest, together with Gennady Donskoy and Mikhail Roshal.

Exhibitions 
1975

 The Nest, House of Culture, VDNKh, Moscow

1977

 The Nest, Venice Biennale, "La nuova arte Sovietica"

1983 
 1st SZ exhibition (together with Vadim Zakharov).
 Apt-Art Gallery (Apartment of N. Alekseev), Moscow
 2nd SZ exhibition (together with Vadim Zakharov). Apartment M. Roshal, Moscow
 3rd SZ exhibition (together with Vadim Zakharov).
 House of Culture of the 2nd State Bearing Plant on Shabolovka St., Moscow
 4th SZ exhibition (traveling, together with Vadim Zakharov). Apartments of N. Alekseev, I. Chuikov, D. Prigov, A. Yulikov, L. Bazhanov, G. Kizevalter, Moscow

1989 
 5th solo exhibition "SZ". Organized during the exhibition Muveszet helyet Muveszet, Mucsarnok, Budapest, Hungary

1990 
 Bruder Karamazoff (together with Vadim Zakharov). Sophia Ungers Gallery, Cologne, Germany

2004 
 Group SZ (together with Vadim Zakharov). E.K. Art Bureau, Moscow

2008 
 The Nest Group. National Center for Contemporary Art, Moscow
 Aspects of meta-art. Project "Factory", Moscow

2009 
 Fragma, pragma and enigma (together with Yuri Albert and Andrei Filippov). Project "Factory", Moscow
 Show and Tell. The artist and his model (together with Yuri Albert and Andrei Filippov). Stella Art Foundation, Moscow

2018 
"Owls are not what they seem" joint exhibition together with Tatyana Sherstyuk, Gallery 21, Moscow Contemporary Art Center Winzavod, Moscow

References 

1956 births
Living people
Artists from Moscow
Russian contemporary artists
Soviet artists